Kotnis is the surname found in multiple communities in Maharashtra. It can belong to the Deshastha Brahmin, Saraswats or Chandraseniya Kayastha Prabhu(CKP).

People with the surname
Dwarkanath Kotnis, was one of the five Indian physicians dispatched to China to provide medical assistance during the Second Sino-Japanese War in 1938.
Kamala Kotnis, an Indian actress who played roles in Telugu and hindi movies.

References

Surnames of Indian origin